The 1996 Orlando mayoral election was held on Tuesday, April 16, 1996, to elect the mayor of Orlando, Florida. Incumbent mayor Glenda Hood was reelected.

Municipal elections in Orlando and Orange County are non-partisan.  Had no candidate received a majority of the votes in the general election, a runoff would have been held between the two candidates that received the greatest number of votes.

Results

References

1996
1996 Florida elections
1996 United States mayoral elections
1990s in Orlando, Florida